Tristar and Red Sector Incorporated (TRSI) is a demogroup which formed in 1990. It came about from the longest-running cooperation in scene history. RSI existed from 1985, before being joined by the "T" later on. Evolving from the Commodore 64 to the Amiga and later to PC and various game console platforms - like the PlayStation, Xbox, Nintendo - and set-ups like Arduino, Android or Blu-ray, TRSI released a number of digital productions, dedicated to experimenting in phreaking or network alteration. Its members were spread around the world and still contribute to computer scene art and code after more than 27 years of history.

History

1985 to 1987
Red Sector Incorporated (RSI) was founded with a focus on the Commodore 64 as a group for cracks, fixes, trainers, packs, intros and demos. The founders were three suppliers from Canada: Bill Best, Greg and Kangol Kid. After the initial formation in the spring of 1985, The Skeleton and Baudsurfer set up RSI's first domain, "The Pirates Ship" BBS the following summer, which eventually became the "Dawn of Eternity" BBS.

At the end of the year, Irata and Mister Zeropage were asked to join the group and set up a European section in Germany, with Irata being the group's main trader, followed by additional importers in the United States. Slogans at the time included "No risk, no fun - Red Sector Number One" and "Red Sector - The Leading Force". The Light Circle was a basis for several future European members of RSI, a coalition of Radwar Enterprises, Cracking Force Berlin and Flash Cracking Formation.

Red Sector Incorporated first released on the Amiga 1000 in 1986. During the summer, RSI decided to concentrate on the Amiga and formed an Amiga division.

In the beginning of 1987, Red Sector's Commodore 64 section became dormant, to bundle forces on the Amiga. At this time, RSI's first Amiga demo was coded by HQC and released to the Scene. It was followed by the second, "Twilight with Music" by Karsten Obarski. At the end of the year, a short-term cooperation was formed with Ghenna of Defjam, marking the first group cooperation on the Amiga.

1988 to 1989
By now, all active members had moved to the Amiga. A fast stream of imports from the United States and Canada continued to be processed in Europe. Among a wave of police raids, Irata and Mister Zeropage got busted and RSI fell asleep for a period of time.
A slow restart by Irata, Onyx and SLL began the recovery of Red Sector Incorporated in the second half of this year, while Onyx came to know TCC Design. For the first time, RSI met Tristar members to party together. RSI and Defjam restarted releasing together. Later on, Irata became the main leader of the group. Slogan at the time: "RSI - The Voice of the Underground".
In 1989, Red Sector Incorporated recruited The Clumsy Creepers as their demo division on Amiga. The filemagazine "News on Tour" got its first issue in August, written by RSI.
In September, the "Red Sector Mega Demo" was published for ECS, a milestone in scene demo history and an instant classic, manufactured as a two 3½-inch disc production, winning the "Tristar Party" demo competition. It was later voted one of the best ten Amiga demos ever. Among others: Coding by TCC Design, Doctor Beat, Delta. Music by Romeo Knight, SCS, Mark 2 and Bit Arts. Graphics by Scum, Dark, Doctor C, Rat Sign, Delta.
The demo division also released "The Red Sector Demomaker" on the Amiga, which was distributed by Data Becker.

1990 to 1992
The group Public Enemy was founded. Red Sector Incorporated and Public Enemy joined forces and extended to the PC.
In February, RSI published the first issue of "Criminal" magazine.
RSI was voted number one in the "World Charts" on Amiga.
The Amiga demo "Follow Me" was released for ECS, followed by "Revenge of the Babbnasen" in the same format. It won the Cebit demo competition in March.
On the Amiga, RSI and the relatively unknown group TRS combined to become Tristar and Red Sector Incorporated, or as short form: TRSI, on June 29. This was the beginning of the longest running merger in scene history up until today, being finalized at "The Silents and Red Sector Summer Conference" in Denmark. From there, TRSI became a vital crew in scene history, diverting activities to several playgrounds.
Slogans at the time: "Twice the Fun - Double the Trouble" and "Back to the Roots"
For a brief period, a multi-platform cooperation was in effect: Public Enemy/Tristar and Red Sector Incorporated/Defjam/The Dream Team.
Public Enemy left the coalition, followed by the Dream Team, in 1991.
Tristar and Red Sector Incorporated remained and still consists predominantly of European members from Germany, Austria, France and England.
TRSI spawned its Austrian Amiga demo section Surprise ! Productions, founded by TMB, which soon partially left again.
In December, the "Prism Vectors" demo ranked third at the "Prime Party" on the Amiga.
Slogans at the time: "The sleeping Gods" and "The Everlasting"
In March 1992, the TRSI "Misery Dentro" won the Cebit demo competition on the Amiga.
After previously being abandoned, the Commodore 64 section was revived by Irata, Mister President and Mister Cursor as RSI in August, featuring Psychobilly, Benson, Dense, Termo and Street Tuff.
TRSI spawned yet another demo division, called Masque.
Their Amiga demo Wicked Sensation by Wayne Mendoza, Tee Jay, Peachy and Romeo Knight won the World of Commodore exhibition in November. Ecliptica by Romeo Knight, Hellrazor, Fade One, Double Trouble, Viola Bros. and Spider, done by the Danish division, ranked third in December at "The Party" on the AMIGA.

1993 to 1999
RSI was voted the best first release group on the Commodore 64.
In April, No Pain, No Gain came in second as Amiga 40K at "The Gathering".
Masque also ranked second with Misery Dentro II at the Cebit demo competition on the Amiga, crafted by Peachy, Virgill, Dreamer and Wayne Mendoza. Meanwhile, TRSI formed a Polish demo section.
Tristar and Red Sector Incorporated published several noteworthy demos, among them "Cubic Dream", "Artifice" and "Victoria".
The groups overall production activities peaked early in 1994.
A number of releases was produced in cooperation with Zenith.
Slogan at the time: "No fame, no money, no power - only Fun 'n Friendship"
On the Commodore 64, "The Party IV Scroll" demo got shipped. The last issue of the Nr. 1 papermag on C64 "Bullet Proof" was released - after the release the Editor "Dense", left the ecene.
Fiver2 published his "Honeycomb" slideshow. The Polish demo section of TRSI formed Nah-Kolor in the middle of 1995.
Shortly after, it had been dissected from Tristar and Red Sector Incorporated, with some members staying.
Zinkfloid founded TRSI Recordz to publish the scene music samplers "Cyberlogik" I and II, plus an album by CNCD.
TRSI also released on the SNES Super Famicom.
A game soundtrack album by Doctor Awesome was published by TRSI Recordz in 1996.
The "Television" demo ranked second in April at "Scenest" on the Commodore 64.
In December, "Twin Peaks" came in fourth on the AMIGA at "The Party", sporting soundtrack by Virgill.
The Finnish crew Mellow Chips joined Tristar and Red Sector Incorporated as a sub group demo section in 1997.
TRSI Recordz published an album by Andrew Barnabas.
In July, TRSI and Locker House released "Insomnia" issue one, an Amiga disc magazine.
"Dose" by Mellow Chips ranked second in October as combined Amiga demo at the "Demolition Party".
Mellow Chips of Tristar and Red Sector Incorporated won the demo competition at "The Gathering" with the Amiga production "Rise" in 1998.
TRSI and The Light Circle released for the Nintendo 64.
In October, "EKG" came in second at "Compushare" as a PC 64K with Replay.
TRSI Recordz published an album by Muffler in 1999.
"Spice Melange" won the "Bush Party" in June in the PC demo competition with Polar Dreams.

2000 to 2007
Tristar and Red Sector Incorporated, in the new millennium, released on the PlayStation and Game Boy Color.
At the "TRSAC Party", TRSI ranked second with Bizarre Love Triangle on the Amiga, with Haujobb and Depth in October 2001.
In 2003 some members left the coalition to revive TRS again, which did not stop the remaining formation to produce up-to-date titles.
Tristar and Red Sector Incorporated released on the Game Boy Advance.
TRSI published the first ever realtime ray tracer in 1KB in August 2004, "SW Raytrace 'em All" by Hitchhikr.
Together with Hoodlum and Paradox, the "Hoodlum Cracktro" was released and widely acknowledged in November.
In April 2005 "Mini" won the "Maximum Overdose" party for TRSI as combined demo on the Commodore 64.
Tristar and Red Sector Incorporated produced for the DTV in 2006. "Animatron" came in third on the Commodore 64 at the Breakpoint demo competition in April.
For the console demo section, "Bloody Memories" ranked fourth with Titan on the PSP.
At "Maximum Overdose" in May, "Rohrschach" won as combined demo on the Commodore 64 for TRSI.
The Evoke took place in August, where a third place was scored with Titan for "Lick It" on the PSP.
In April 2007, Tristar and Red Sector Incorporated released a firstie on the Xbox 360 with Bloody Memories 2.01, a combined XNA demo and sample game, The Great Giana Sisters, ranking fourth in the wild demo competition at "Breakpoint", produced by 71M, Ayatollah, Mike, Shazz, Spotter, H2O, WODK and Rebb.
Ghost in the Machine took the crown at Maximum Overdose as combined demo on the DTV in May, done by Street Tuff, Peiselulli, Linus, Titus of Rabenauge, Cadaver and Spotter.
The One Trick Pony Intro scored first as PC demo at Sundown in September.
TRSI's 4K Wannabe demo won the Main Party PC wild demo competition in November.
Astaroth rejoined TRSI with a Flash demo called Back2Black at Evoke.

2008 to 2009
In February, 2008 - A DTV Odyssey by Street Tuff, Benson, Peiselulli, Linus, and Spotter won the Oxyron demo competition for TRSI, including its very own DTV Modplayer and Speech Emulation.
2nd Element ranked third at Breakpoint during the animation competition in April, done by H2O, Daxx, Teis, Core and Dicab. In addition, the PSP Slideshow was released by Ayatollah, Mike, H2O, 71M, Spotter and Syphus, which later got converted to PC and MAC by Pasy, Pontscho, Chromag and H2O.
Tristar and Red Sector Incorporated published the Kernel for Demos by Peiselulli on the DTV, plus the classic game Boulder Dash and its source code on the same platform.
The Sundown Invitation by 71M, H2O, Teis Dicab and Spotter on personal computer was widely well received in July, together with Bitfellas and UK Scene Allstars.
TRSI reached third place with a live coded Flash demo in August at Evoke called Back2Red.
In October, 7K Candy by 71M, H2O and Chromag placed first at Main 2008 as wild demo.
The "Numerica Artparty" mp3 competition in March 2009 was won by Tristar and Red Sector Incorporated. Parallel, a "T2" cracktro for Genesis had been released.
In April, "Fortress of Narzod" by Peiselulli, Linus, Benson and Street Tuff secured a second place with 32K in the 96K game competition on C64 at Breakpoint, while "Le Cube" won third as a wild demo in conjunction with Drifters and Calodox plus extra help by Spotter and Santa. A handmade graphic "The Sleeping Gods" came in fourth, penciled by Spotter.
The mp3 and tracking music competitions at Evoke in August brought a second respectively third place for the group, while at "Buenzli", the joined venture of Drifters/TRSI/Calodox got the second prize for the OHP demo "Laseriter".
The 4K demo "Caulifire" collected a third slot at "Function" in September. Early October saw TRSI contributing to the "Main" party in France, including a popular invitro in conjunction with Alcatraz and the Rebels cooperation "Hil", which scored fourth as combined 4K on PC. A DTV production Misery III got first as wild demo, "My private Spacetrip" by Seven ranked second at the huge screen on the locations rooftop and "I'm free" by Teis came in third in the music competition.
In December, the "TMDC Twelve" party witnessed a first place for the textmode demo Compofiller, crafted by Teis and Hardy. At The Ultimate Meeting, Tristar and Red Sector Incorporated won the 4K compo with l4Kuna, again by Hardy and Teis.

2010 to 2011
April saw the last "Breakpoint" and a second place for Peiselulli's 96K game Spike, with help by Linus, Benson, Streetuff and Yazoo. Spotter released Para'N'droiD in cooperation with Bodo of Rabenauge,  of Brain Control and music by Ralf Wadephul, the first real interactive touch-screen, motion-sensor and live video feed demo on Google's Android mobile phone platform. After presenting the final 3D version of "Para'N'droiD" at the Droidcon in Berlin with Irata, ZDF / 3sat first postet the final video on the net. To honor the old school scene spirit, the complete source code was also made public, to push development on Android platforms! June 2010 brought a 3rd place in the "At Party" Freestyle Music Competition for the group.
TRSI was twenty years old, still alive and kicking! The claim for Tristar and Red Sector Incorporated's anniversary year said: "TRSi believe". In August, Teis won the Tiny Tracking Music competition of "Evoke", while Hardy's 4K PC intro "Large Hedron Collider" captured second place. Hardy's PC 4K The Amster-Damn Cancer Cube ranked third at "Main" in October, parallel to a third place in the Big Screen Compo with "Wicked Huge Sensation". Finally, "Happy New Year" by Rebels and TRSI settled at the second slot as a 4K on PC at "TUM" in December.
The "Revision" party in April 2011 witnessed the birth of a critically acclaimed music disc called TRSi Elektroshock - We never Stop the Chip Rock produced by Spotter, with help of 71M, Sal-One, Irata and others, as a retrospective of 25 years in underground sound, including tracks by Razor 1911, Fairlight, various TRSI members plus many more artists and renowned voice actors. Also, Teis secured a second place in the Executable New School music compo. In July 2011, Cons came in 3rd in the "Sommarhack" Music competition. Early August witnessed Rebb's two second places in "Assembly's" Fast and Extreme Music competition, while Street Tuff's "We got Signal" captured third place at "Evoke" for the Wild compo, as a C64 one-filer, including a calligraphy logo by Sai and Spotter. The "Demodays Party", formerly known as "Buenzli", in later 2011 was a success for TRSI, by adding a first place for WoDK in the Graphics competition, a third place for Cons and Teis featuring Streettuff in the Music competition and, in collaboration with H2o, another first slot in the Wild competition with Krawall(brause). In October, a third place was added to the list with Cons' track for the "TRSAC" 32k Exemusic competition. Concluding the year 2011, Hardy and Teis won the Combined 4K compo at "The Ultimate Meeting" for TRSI with Tunnel Angst.

2012
The second installment of "Revision" over Easter weekend in April did see two important releases for the group. In the Old School Demo compo, Tristar and Red Sector Incorporated's 8-bit crew ranked 2nd, with Street Tuff's last C64 release, counting 12 multi-parts, featuring Benson, Peiselulli, Stainless Steel and Titus: Krawall Deluxe Expanding the all-time record to five world First Releases on new hardware platforms in six consecutive years, the TRSI Console Division presented Funky Fresh, a realtime Blu-ray interactive production, running on PS3, stand alone BR boxes and PC soft players. This 2nd place in the Wild compo was done by Luis, Forcer and Battlecommand, produced by Spotter, included help of Wodk and Alien, after an idea cited by Bodo. To support development, the full source code was published. Slogan at the time: "Secondly - First things First". A week later, the "Pixel Jam" party in Cleveland brought a 2nd place in Freestyle Graphics for TRSI's Forcer, followed up by a 3rd place with Cons in the same competition. Still back to back in April, Forcer struck a silver medal at "Inercia Demoparty" with his "Deja Vu" for the Graphics compo and secured the competition winning first slot at VIP in the Bitmap Graphics event with "Master of Aviation". At the same party, WodK's "Fly 2 VIP" won the Raytraced Graphics compo.
In June, Titan, TRSI and Sun Spire Records got 1st place in the PC competition with their coop invitro Nordlicht, presented at "Flashback" and sporting graphics by Forcer. Later this month, TRSI and Desire won the Overhead Projector compo of "At Party" with the OHP Mega Demo 9000, engineered by Luis, with a soundtrack by Cons, while Forcer was crowned in the Freestyle Graphics slot.
July brought the "Nordlicht" party with this high-score: Forcer and Cons got 1st and 2nd place in the Graphics compo, Virgill and Cons secured a second in the Photo competition and Vampires Empire was the runner up in the Demo compo on DTV, by Peiselulli, Streetuff, Forcer, Zabu plus Aegis. August's "Evoke" in Cologne handed the gold medal to Hardy and Virgill for Zuckz in the 4K competition. In September, the "Demodays" party got a win for Forcer and a 3rd place for Wodk in the Graphics compo, followed by a 2nd slot for Cons at "Sundown" in the Old School Graphics discipline. "Main" party in October brought the 2nd place in a Combined Intro category by Hardy and Virgill with Gangnam.
Montreal hosted the "Recursion" party in November, where TRSI won first prizes in: Graphics, the Demo compo for Chalcogens as a coop with Desire and Quebarium, plus the Wild Demo slot for Metal Skin Slidetro by Forcer, Luis, Romeo Knight Kepler and Spotter. Also, their new official .nfo file with ASCII art by H7 was released.

2013
February saw Xerxes winning the SceneSat Radio Remix of the Year Award as Best Newcomer for his version of "Ba1", released on "TRSI Elektroshock", the Vinyl Edition. Celebrating this, the digital mastering version of "TRSI Elektroshock" was published in March, with a refreshed playlist. A few days before the Easter weekend, Elko got 2nd in the 3 Color Logo compo on CSDB on his Digital Playground. In April, the third "Revision" party got Streetuff winning the Old School Intro compo with 4Krawall. In the Wild, TRSI and SVatG got third through "Jupiter & Beyond", followed by Space Madness by Luis and Spotter, with help from Elko, H7, Subi, Wertstahl, Kompositkrut, Meitikos, and Alien^PDX, on Arduino Mega and Game Arduino. Modern Graphics were won by Forcer for "Double Trouble", in a combination with Prince. The cooperation between TRSI and Cherry Darling got third place for Games with "October Games".
At the "Nordlicht" party in July, places one (in cooperation with DSS and Crest), two, three and five were won by TRSI in the Oldschool demo compo. "Evoke" in Cologne won second prize for Kologne Koder Kolorz in 4K by Hardy Hard, followed by a third slot for Elko in the pixeled pics with "Healthy Meals for Summer Days" and a runner up in freestyle graphics by Prince.

BBS

References

Bibliography
Tamas Polgar. 2005. Freax - The brief history of the computer Demoscene. CSW Verlag. Pages 107, 140, 155.
Tamas Polgar. 2006. Freax - The Art album. CSW Verlag. Pages 125, 153, 154, 157.
Denis Moschitto and Evrim Sen. 2007. Hackerland - Logfile of the Scene. Social Media Verlag. Glossar.

External links
 RSI official website
 TRSI official website
 TRSI on Pouet Net
 TRSI on CSDb
 TRSI on Scenery Amiga
 TRSI PC cracktros on Defacto2
 TRSI PC file and information repository on Defacto2
 TRSI selected old school files on Scene. Org
 TRSI Recordz Discography
 Amiga Music Preservation All TRSI Amiga Musicians on AMP
 Red Sector Incorporated Megademo
 ROM4.LHA Article by Mop. R.O.M. diskmag, Issue 4 (requires an Amiga or Amiga emulator, such as UAE)
 TRSI History 1998

Demogroups
Warez groups
Computing and society